Poljak may refer to:

 Poljak (surname), a South Slavic surname
 Poljak, Sanski Most, a village in Bosnia